George Akume  (born 27 December 1953) is a Nigerian politician who is the Minister of Special Duties and Inter-governmental Affairs. He was a Senator of the Federal Republic of Nigeria. He was the Minority Leader of the Senate from June 2011 to June 2015. He was also the Governor of Benue State from  May 1999 to  May 2007. User the People's Democratic Party (PDP), he was the first Governor to have completed two terms in office in Benue State.
 
Akume was re-elected Senator for Benue North-West in the April 2011 elections, running on the platform of the Action Congress of Nigeria (ACN). He won another term in 2015 but lost to Senator Orke Jev of the PDP in 2019. On July 23, 2019, President Buhari nominated Akume to serve as a minister.

Background
Akume obtained a bachelor's degree in Sociology and a master's degree in Labour Relations from the University of Ibadan. He now resides in Abuja, Nigeria.

Political career
In 1999, he became governor of Benue State and served two terms of four years. He won elections to represent the people of Benue as a senator for Benue North-West in Nigeria's senate.
Akume was re-elected Senator for Benue North-West in the April 2011 elections, running on the Action Congress of Nigeria (ACN) platform. He polled 261,726 votes, defeating Terngu Tsegba of the PDP who won 143,354 votes. He was again re-elected to the senate under the platform of the All Progressives Congress (APC) in 2015. He was chairman senate committee on army and a ranking member of senate.
He was nominated and confirmed a minister of the Federal Democratic Republic of Nigeria by Muhammadu Buhari.

See also
List of governors of Benue State

References

1953 births
Living people
Governors of Benue State
Members of the Senate (Nigeria)
People from Benue State
All Progressives Congress politicians
Peoples Democratic Party state governors of Nigeria
21st-century Nigerian politicians
University of Ibadan alumni